The sphenomandibular ligament (internal lateral ligament) is one of the three ligaments of the temporomandibular joint. It is situated medially to - and generally separate from - the articular capsule of the joint. Superiorly, it is attached to the spine of the sphenoid bone; inferiorly, it is attached to the lingula of mandible. The SML acts to limit inferior-ward movement of the mandible.

The SML is derived from Meckel's cartilage.

Anatomy 
The SML is a flat, thin band. It widens/broadens inferiorlybefore as it reaches its inferior attachment, measuring about 12 mm in width on average at the point of its inferior attachment.

Attachments 
Superiorly, the SML is attached to the spine of the sphenoid bone (spina angularis.

Inferiorly, it is attached at to lingula of mandible (which occurs just proximally to the mandibular foramen).

Anatomical relations 
The lateral pterygoid muscle, auriculotemporal nerve, and the maxillary artery and maxillary vein are situated laterally to the SML (the vessels and nerve coursing betwixt the SML, and the neck of the mandibular condyle).

The chorda tympani nerve is situated medially to the SML near its upper end.

The medial pterygoid muscle is situated inferolaterally to the SML.

The inferior alveolar nerve, artery and vein, and a parotid lobule are situated anteroinferiorly to the SML (all being interposed between the SML and the ramus of mandible).

Between the SML and the pharynx are situated adipose tissue, and a pharyngeal vein.

Function 
The function of the sphenomandibular ligament is to limit distension of the mandible in an inferior direction. It is slack when the temporomandibular joint (TMJ) is in closed position; it is taut when the condyle of the mandible is situated anterior to the temporomandibular ligament. The SML has about 5 mm of slack when the jaw is closed; it becomes taut when the jaw is open roughly half-way.

References

External links
 
 http://ect.downstate.edu/courseware/haonline/labs/l27/070105.htm

Ligaments of the head and neck